SM U-3 or U-III was the lead boat of the U-3 class of submarines or U-boats built for and operated by the Austro-Hungarian Navy ( or ) before and during the First World War. The submarine was built as part of a plan to evaluate foreign submarine designs, and was built by Germaniawerft of Kiel, Germany.

U-3 was authorized in 1906, begun in March 1907, launched in August 1908, and towed from Kiel to Pola in January 1909. The design of the submarine had poor diving qualities and several modifications to U-3s diving planes and fins occurred in her first years in the Austro-Hungarian Navy. Her armament, as built, consisted of two bow torpedo tubes with a supply of three torpedoes, but was supplemented with a deck gun in 1915.

The boat was commissioned into the Austro-Hungarian Navy in September 1909, and served as a training boat—sometimes making as many as ten cruises a month—through the beginning of the First World War in 1914. At the start of that conflict, she was one of only four operational submarines in the Austro-Hungarian Navy U-boat fleet. Over the first year of the war, U-3 conducted reconnaissance cruises out of Cattaro. On 12 August 1915, U-3 was damaged after an unsuccessful torpedo attack on an Italian armed merchant cruiser and, after she surfaced the next day, was sunk by a French destroyer. U-3s commanding officer and 6 men died in the attack; the 14 survivors were captured.

Design and construction 
U-3 was built as part of a plan by the Austro-Hungarian Navy to competitively evaluate foreign submarine designs from Simon Lake, Germaniawerft, and John Philip Holland. The Austro-Hungarian Navy authorized the construction of U-3 (and sister ship, U-4) in 1906 by Germaniawerft of Kiel, Germany. U-3 was laid down on 12 March 1907 and launched on 20 August 1908. After completion, she was towed via Gibraltar to Pola, where she arrived on 24 January 1909.

U-3s design was an improved version of Germaniawerft's design for the Imperial German Navy's first U-boat, and featured a double hull with internal saddle tanks. The Germaniawerft engineers refined the design's hull shape through extensive model trials.

She displaced  surfaced and  submerged. She was armed with two bow  torpedo tubes, and was designed to carry up to three torpedoes.

Service career 
After U-3s arrival at Pola in January 1909, she was commissioned into the Austro-Hungarian Navy on 12 September 1909 as SM U-3. During the evaluation of the U-3 class conducted by the Navy, the class' poor diving and handling characteristics were noted. To alleviate the diving problems, U-3s fins were changed in size and shape several times, and eventually, the front diving planes were removed and a stationary stern flap was affixed to the hull. U-3 served as a training boat between 1910 and 1914 and made as many as ten cruises per month in that capacity.

At the beginning of World War I, she was one of only four operational submarines in the Austro-Hungarian Navy. On 22 August 1914, U-3 began operating reconnaissance cruises out of the naval base at Brioni, but moved a month later to Cattaro. In April 1915, a  quick firing (QF) deck gun was added.

On 10 August, U-3 departed from Cattaro for what would be her final time for a patrol north of Brindisi. Two days later, while returning to Cattaro from the Straits of Otranto, U-3 launched a torpedo attack on the Italian armed merchant cruiser . The torpedoes missed their mark and, in the ensuing action, U-3 was rammed by Citta di Catania, which destroyed the U-boat's periscope. When she attempted to surface, she was shelled by the escorting destroyers. She submerged to escape the artillery but was further damaged by a depth charge attack from the French destroyer Bisson while resting on the seabed. When U-3 surfaced the following day, she was shelled and sunk by Bisson. Fourteen of her crew were saved and captured, but seven died in the attack, including her commander, Linienschiffsleutnant Karel Strnad. U-3 had no successes during the war.

Notes

References

Bibliography

External links

 The Austro-Hungarian Submarine Force

U-3-class submarines
U-boats commissioned in 1909
Maritime incidents in 1915
U-boats sunk in 1915
World War I shipwrecks in the Adriatic Sea
1908 ships
World War I submarines of Austria-Hungary
Ships built in Kiel